The Ning Hai class were a pair of light cruisers in the Chinese fleet before World War II. While Ning Hai was quickly commissioned, tensions between China and Japan plagued the efforts to complete Ping Hai. Both served as flagships of the Republic of China Navy (ROCN), with Ping Hai taking over the role from its older sister ship since April 1937. The ROCN had an ambitious plan to procure a larger and more-powerful command cruiser and then to reassign the two vessels as scouts/flagships of submarine flotillas, but the outbreak of war with Japan put an end to all related efforts (including the acquisition of submarines).

Ning Hai and Ping Hai were sunk in defense of the Kiangyin Fortress, Yangtze River, near Nanking by Japanese aircraft (of which the two ships shot down four) on 23 September 1937, but then refloated by the Japanese. Originally they were to be transferred to the puppet government of Wang Jing-Wei, but the Japanese then had a change of heart and outfitted them first as barracks hulks and ultimately as escort ships Ioshima (Ning Hai) and Yasoshima (Ping Hai) in 1944.

Design
The lead ship of the class Ning Hai also had a small hangar for two single-seat floatplanes, a Japanese-built Aichi AB-3 and a similar aircraft of local design, the Naval Air Establishment Ning Hai.

The Ning Hai class did have a number of drawbacks. Their high centres of gravity, a common flaw to numerous Japanese-designed warships of the era, made the ships unstable in heavy seas. Given the ships' primary role as coastal defence ships, these were probably acceptable trade-offs.

Ships

References

External links 

 

Cruiser classes
 
World War II naval ships of China
China–Japan military relations